Namita Mundada is a leader of
Bharatiya Janata Party and a member of the Maharashtra Legislative Assembly elected from Kaij Assembly constituency in Beed city.

Positions held
 2019: Elected to Maharashtra Legislative Assembly.

References

Living people
Maharashtra MLAs 2019–2024
Bharatiya Janata Party politicians from Maharashtra
People from Beed

Year of birth missing (living people)